Mauryne Eleanor Taylor Brent (born Mauryne Eleanor Taylor; November 14, 1921 – August 3, 2013) was a model, singer, poet, and actress. She starred opposite Mantan Moreland in the film Come On, Cowboy!. She was on the cover of Jet magazine on January 26, 1956. Jazz pianist Billy Taylor was her cousin and her half-sister Shirlee Taylor Haizlip included her in memoir The Sweeter the Juice; A Family Memoir. She wrote poetry. Her memoir, The Heart Speaks was published in 1976.

Her father Julian Augustus Taylor was an evangelist preacher and an NAACP organizer. Her husband Leland Simmons Brent died November 8, 1943. She had three children.

She copyrighted a song she wrote the words to in 1964. It was one of at least three songs she wrote with music by Officus Delimus (O. D.) Jamison (January 16, 1929 – May 23, 2010).

Filmography
Come On, Cowboy!

References

African-American women musicians
African-American musicians
African-American poets
African-American models
1921 births
2013 deaths
20th-century African-American people
21st-century African-American people
20th-century African-American women
21st-century African-American women